Wu Yibing defeated Aleksandar Kovacevic in the final, 6–7(10–12), 7–6(15–13), 6–3, to win the singles tennis title at the 2022 Indy Challenger. Wu saved six championship points en route to his third consecutive title on the 2022 ATP Challenger Tour.

This was the first edition of the tournament.

Seeds

Draw

Finals

Top half

Bottom half

References

External links
Main draw
Qualifying draw

Indy Challenger - 1